Melocactus caroli-linnaei is a cactus (a member of the family Cactaceae) found in Jamaica. Like all species of Melocactus, it forms a "cephalium" when mature – a dense mass of areoles covered with wool and spines at the tip of the stem. Flowers are produced only from the cephalium.

The species was originally named Cactus melocactus by Carl Linnaeus in 1753. The genus Cactus was later split and the pre-Linnaean name Melocactus was used for melocacti. The rules of botanical nomenclature forbid the repetition of a genus name and a specific epithet, so the name "Melocactus melocactus" is not allowed. In 1991, Nigel Taylor gave the species its current name, Melocactus caroli-linnaei.

References

caroli-linnaei
Cacti of North America
Endemic flora of Jamaica
Plants described in 1753
Taxa named by Carl Linnaeus